Howie is an American variety/sketch comedy television series starring Howie Mandel that aired on CBS from July 1 to July 22, 1992.

Summary
The series consisted of sketches involving Mandel and the other series regulars as well as footage from his stage performances at the Celebrity Theater in Anaheim, California.

Regulars
Howie Mandel
Shirley Green
Paul Ebejer
Gilbert Gottfried
Clarence Clemons
Lita Ford
Quiddlers

Guests
Robert Goulet
Billy Joel
Jackie Mason
Little Richard
Gary Busey

References

1992 American television series debuts
1992 American television series endings
1990s American sketch comedy television series
1990s American variety television series
CBS original programming
English-language television shows